Good Luck America is a documentary-style original series from Snapchat about U.S. politics. It is produced by Snapchat and hosted by Snap's head of news Peter Hamby, a former political reporter at CNN. The first episode of the series was published in January 2016, and is in its eighth season, reportedly reaching roughly 6 million viewers per episode. The show won an Edward R. Murrow Award for Excellence in Innovation in 2017.

Good Luck America was the first "show" created by Snapchat, which has since developed similar programming with ESPN, NBCUniversal, Turner, the NFL, ABC and other major networks.

Availability
The show is made available to users in the United States, Canada, the UK and Australia.

Each episode is available for 48 hours on Snapchat and past episodes are searchable in the app as well.

Season One of Good Luck America had 22 million unique viewers on Snapchat. In Seasons 2 and 3, the show was receiving roughly 6 million views per episode. Roughly 75% of the show's viewers are under the age of 25.

US election 

After Snapchat hired longtime CNN journalist Peter Hamby to be head of news, it was speculated that the company would work on their own election coverage. During the election Snapchat offered many live stories and the separate show "Good Luck America", hosted by Hamby, in the Discover-section of the app. Hamby's snaps were also featured in several of the live stories, adding context and explanation to various snaps submitted by users.

After the election Snapchat announced the return of the series, now focusing on U.S. politics under President Donald Trump.

Concept 
The series follows Hamby as he travels throughout the country, promising to show viewers "the people and places that really matter" in American politics. Episodes usually focus on issues rather than news-of-the-day and often feature interviews with major political and media figures including Barack Obama, Hillary Clinton, Steve Bannon, Joe Biden, Paul Ryan, Bernie Sanders, Arnold Schwarzenegger, Tomi Lahren, Elizabeth Warren, Scott Pruitt, John McCain, Kamala Harris, Lindsey Graham, the hosts of Pod Save America and others.

The show is aimed at young people who are increasingly not watching TV news but are instead spending time on mobile platforms like Snapchat. On any given day, Snapchat reaches 41 percent of U.S. 18- to 34-year-olds. An average individual TV network only reaches 9 percent of the same demographic.

According to a report from the Knight Foundation, "More than any political effort on Snapchat, 'Good Luck America' took a bold point of view. While it can’t be described as partisan, it often offered an unabashed critique of traditional media and establishment politics — taking a playfully snarky tone that syncs with Millennials’ well-documented growing mistrust of institutions. The tagline 'Let me show you the people and places that really matter' also acts as a dig on other media outlets, implying that 'Good Luck America' pulls back the curtain for an unvarnished view you can't find elsewhere."

Episodes

Overview

Season 1 
Season 1 consists of election coverage with a range of well-known guests. The last episode of the season is devoted to an interview with President Barack Obama, who Hamby follows on the campaign trail.

Season 2 
The second season changes from focusing on the election to focusing on US politics. Description of the show in the app reads: "This United States is in a pretty weird place right now. Good Luck America has you covered."

Midway through the season, poll questions were added. Typically at a clip featuring Hamby talking to the camera, the viewer is encouraged to "swipe up to vote" and is asked to answer questions about their opinions of political topics related to the episode.

Season 3

References

External links 
 Official website

Snap Inc.
2016 American television series debuts
2010s American television news shows
2020s American television news shows
2010s American documentary television series
2020s American documentary television series